Exochi is a village and a community of the Kozani municipality. Before the 2011 local government reform it was part of the municipality of Kozani, of which it was a municipal district. The 2011 census recorded 114 inhabitants in the community. The community of Exochi covers an area of 16.92 km2.

History
Before the Greco-Turkish population exchange the village, called Bairakli, was inhabited exclusively by Turks. After the population exchange the village was resettled by Greek refugees. The original settlement was evacuated in 1980, as the Public Power Corporation of Greece expanded its lignite mines towards the village. The contemporary settlement of Exochi is adjacent to the community of Koila.

See also
 List of settlements in the Kozani regional unit

References

Populated places in Kozani (regional unit)